Alain Bondue (born 8 April 1959 in Roubaix, France) is a former racing cyclist from  France. He competed for France in the 1980 Summer Olympics held in Moscow, Soviet Union in the individual pursuit event where he finished in second place.

References

External links

1959 births
Living people
French male cyclists
Olympic cyclists of France
Olympic silver medalists for France
Cyclists at the 1980 Summer Olympics
Sportspeople from Roubaix
Olympic medalists in cycling
UCI Track Cycling World Champions (men)
Medalists at the 1980 Summer Olympics
French track cyclists
French Vuelta a España stage winners
Cyclists from Hauts-de-France
21st-century French people
20th-century French people